Klaksvík Municipality (Klaksvíkar kommuna) is a municipality of the Faroe Islands. The town of Klaksvík is the administrative centre.

Its area comprises the majority of the islands of Borðoy, Kalsoy and Svínoy (added 1 January 2009).

It contains the following towns and villages:

On Borðoy:
Klaksvík
Árnafjørður
Ánir
Norðoyri
Skálatoftir (abandoned)
Strond (abandoned)

On Kalsoy:
Húsar
Mikladalur
Syðradalur
Trøllanes

On Svínoy:
Svínoy

Politics

Municipal council
Klaksvík's municipal council consists of 11 members, elected every four years.

References

Municipalities of the Faroe Islands